The Malaysian order of precedence is a hierarchy of important positions within the Government of Malaysia. It has no legal standing but is used by ceremonial protocol. The order of precedence is determined by the Federal Order of Precedence issued by the Prime Minister's Department. The latest one was issued on 13 November 2014. Unless otherwise noted, precedence among persons of equal rank is determined by seniority. As a general rule, spouses share the same rank with another and a person with two positions will take the highest one.

Details  
The following lists precedence of offices and their holders .

See also 
 Orders, decorations, and medals of Malaysia
 List of post-nominal letters#Malaysia

Footnotes

References 

 
Government of Malaysia